COURTS Singapore, is a consumer electronics and furniture retailer in Singapore with a network of 14 stores nationwide and offerings to more than 14,000 electrical and technological lifestyle products. COURTS also operates an online store, offering online shopping, islandwide delivery and click and collect services.

History
In 1850, COURTS Bros was founded by Albert Court in Canterbury, England. The Cohen family acquired COURTS to expand the global footprint. COURTS subsequently converted into a public company and assumed its present name. Over the years, COURTS has established a large and loyal customer base with more than 1.4 million members.

In 2004, Courts Plc, then UK parent company of Courts Singapore, went into administration. Courts operations in Singapore and Malaysia was subsequently acquired by Asia Retail Group, comprising Baring Private Equity Asia and Topaz Investment.

Present
Presently, in Singapore, its store network includes 13 retail outlets islandwide and a Courts Megastore at the Tampines Retail Park.

Courts Asia also has a retail presence in Malaysia and Indonesia and collectively operates a network of 70 stores in Southeast Asia.

Outside of Asia, the Courts brand is present in over ninety-three locations in eleven Caribbean countries, including Antigua and Barbuda, Barbados, Belize, Dominica, Grenada, Guyana, Jamaica, St. Kitts and Nevis, St. Vincent and the Grenadines, St. Lucia, and Trinidad and Tobago. A store-branded Courts Caribbean is located in Jamaica, New York to serve Caribbean immigrants living in the United States wishing to send gifts to family members in their countries of birth. The American store positions itself as an ethnic and nostalgic brand.

Courts branded stores outside of Asia are operated and managed by separate owners.

Courts Megastore
Pioneered at 50 Tampines North Drive 2, Singapore 528766 in Tampines, Singapore on 16 December 2006, Courts Megastore is a large warehouse-style (Big-Box concept) electrical store, and a sub-brand of Courts. Courts Megastores are usually larger in size than its retail counterparts, and usually has retail space spanning multiple floors. With the success of the Megastore concept, Courts has opened 2 more Megastores in Sri Damansara, Selangor, Malaysia, and Kota Harapan Indah, Indonesia in 2013 and 2014 respectively.

Courts Megastores typically includes a Market Hall, an open concept space showcasing daily use home appliances from TVs to cooking and household electronics, and F&B outlets. Home furnishing, bedding and interior products are usually located on the 2nd and 3rd stories.

Awards and recognition
In 2013, COURTS won Best Securitisation Deal Awards at the Asset Triple A Regional Awards 2013 and the Asiamoney & EuroWeek Awards 2013 
In 2011, COURTS who was awarded the Case Trust Gold Certification as the only IT, Furniture and Electronics retailer 
In 2010, COURTS was awarded the Premium GEM (Furniture & Furnishing / Electrical & Electronics) by Singapore Retailer Association for the retail industry mystery shopping programme
In 2007, Winner of Planet Retail's Innovation Award 2007 (Megastore)
In 2005, Awarded the International Headquarters Award by Singapore Minister for Trade and Industry

References

 About COURTS

External links
 COURTS Official website

Retail companies established in 1974
Furniture retailers
Retail companies of Singapore
Singaporean brands